Mikael Schiller is the executive chairman and co-owner of Acne Studios, the Stockholm-based multidisciplinary fashion house.

Schiller joined the company in 2001 while studying for a master's degree from Stockholm School of Economics. Shortly after helping the company to write an investment memorandum, Schiller was asked to become the managing director.

Prior to Acne Studios, Schiller worked as a fireworks entrepreneur, psychology teacher and investment manager. Schiller was on the board of Finnish furniture group Artek between 2010 and 2013.

References

Swedish business executives
Year of birth missing (living people)
Living people
Stockholm School of Economics alumni